Petr Sobotka (born  in Duchcov) is a Czech male weightlifter, competing in the +105 kg category and representing Czech Republic at international competitions. He participated at the 2000 Summer Olympics in the +105 kg event. He competed at world championships, most recently at the 2009 World Weightlifting Championships.

Major results

References

External links
 

1975 births
Living people
Czech male weightlifters
Weightlifters at the 2000 Summer Olympics
Olympic weightlifters of the Czech Republic
People from Duchcov
Sportspeople from the Ústí nad Labem Region